Filippo Scotti (born 22 December 1999) is an Italian actor. He is known for his role as Fabietto Schisa in the 2021 film The Hand of God, for which he won the Marcello Mastroianni Award at the 78th Venice International Film Festival.

He began his career as a stage actor with Il marchese di Collino, a Patrizia Di Martino play, before working on the 2020 Netflix series Luna nera.

Early life and career

Filippo Scotti was born on 22 December 1999 in Gravedona. Both his parents are teachers. He moved to Naples when he was a child. In 2010 he enrolled in various theatrical courses and workshops, working from 2015 to 2017 with the Murìcena company. Then he acted in several short films. In 2021 he starred as Fabietto Schisa in the film The Hand of God.

Filmography

Film

Television

Theatre

References

External links

 
 

1999 births
21st-century Italian male actors
Italian male film actors
Italian male stage actors
Italian male television actors
Living people
Male actors from Naples
People from the Province of Como